Ben Charles Wilson (16 July 1928 – 28 July 1998), was a British Peer, the 4th Baron Nunburnholme, and former head of the prominent English shipowning family of Thomas Wilson Sons & Co.

Ancestry

References
 Genealogical details on Cracroft's Peerage
 Charles Robert Wynn-Carrington, 1st Marquess of Lincolnshire
 Barons Nunburnholme's page

1928 births
1998 deaths
Barons in the Peerage of the United Kingdom